Ranunculus paludosus is a species of perennial herb in the family Ranunculaceae. They have a self-supporting growth form and simple, broad leaves. Individuals can grow to 0.23 m.

Sources

References 

paludosus
Flora of Malta